Club Deportivo Saetas de Oro (sometimes referred as Saetas de Oro) is a Peruvian football club, playing in the city of La Joya, Arequipa, Peru.

History
The Club Saetas de Oro was founded on April 2, 1975.

In 2011 Copa Perú, the club classified to the Regional Stage, but was eliminated by Unión Minas de Orcopampa in the Semifinals.

In 2012 Copa Perú, the club classified to the Departamental Stage, but was eliminated by Atlético Mollendo.

In 2013 Copa Perú, the club classified to the National Stage, but was eliminated by San Simón in the Quarterfinals.

In 2016 Copa Perú, the club classified to the Provincial Stage, but was eliminated by Binacional.

In 2017 Copa Perú, the club classified to the Provincial Stage, but was eliminated in the Cuadrangular Final.

Honours

Regional
Liga Departamental de Arequipa:
Runner-up (2): 2011, 2013

Liga Provincial de Arequipa:
Winners (3): 2009, 2011, 2013
Runner-up (1): 2015

Liga Distrital de La Joya:
Winners (7): 2008, 2010, 2011, 2013, 2016, 2017, 2018

See also
List of football clubs in Peru
Peruvian football league system

References

External links
 En Busca del Honor Perdido
 Los joyinos conservan el liderazgo

Football clubs in Peru
Association football clubs established in 1975
1975 establishments in Peru